Yangochiroptera, or Vespertilioniformes, is a suborder of Chiroptera that includes most of the microbat families, except the Rhinopomatidae, Rhinolophidae, Hipposideridae, and Megadermatidae. These other families, plus the megabats, are seen as part of another suborder, the Yinpterochiroptera. All bats in Yangochiroptera use laryngeal echolocation(LE), which involves the use of high-frequency sounds to detect prey and avoid obstacles.

The rationale for the Yangochiroptera taxon is primarily based on molecular genetics data. The Yangochiroptera/ Yinpterochiroptera classification remains a relatively recent proposal, which challenges the traditional view that megabats and microbats form monophyletic groups by claiming that the superfamily Rhinolophoidea is more closely related to Old World fruit bats than other microbats. Further studies are being conducted, using both molecular and morphological cladistic methodology, to assess the merit of this alternative view of bat evolution.

The term "Yangochiroptera" was apparently proposed in 1984 by Karl F. Koopman.

As an alternative to the subordinal names Yinpterochiroptera and Yangochiroptera, some researchers use the terms Pteropodiformes and Vespertilioniformes. Under this new proposed nomenclature, Vespertilioniformes is the suborder that would replace Yangochiroptera.

Classification
Suborder Yangochiroptera (Vespertilioniformes)
Family Emballonuridae (sac-winged bats)
Family Furipteridae (smoky bats)
Family Miniopteridae (bent-winged or long winged bats)
Family Molossidae (free-tailed bats)
Family Mormoopidae (ghost-faced bats)
Family Mystacinidae (New Zealand short-tailed bats)
Family Myzopodidae (sucker-footed bats)
Family Natalidae (funnel-eared bats)
Family Noctilionidae (bulldog bats)
Family Nycteridae (hollow-faced bats)
Family Phyllostomidae (leaf-nosed bats)
Family Thyropteridae (disk-winged bats)
Family Cistugidae (wing-gland bats)
Family Vespertilionidae (vesper bats)

References

Bat taxonomy
Mammal suborders